Sarah Jane Murphy (born 5 September 1975) is a Zimbabwean former backstroke swimmer. She competed in two events at the 1992 Summer Olympics.

References

External links
 

1975 births
Living people
Zimbabwean female backstroke swimmers
Olympic swimmers of Zimbabwe
Swimmers at the 1992 Summer Olympics
Place of birth missing (living people)
African Games medalists in swimming
Competitors at the 1991 All-Africa Games
African Games gold medalists for Zimbabwe